Choni (Jonê) and Thewo are dialects of a Tibetic language spoken in western China in the vicinity of Jonê County.

Phonology

 A syllable-initial  can be heard as a uvular fricative  before voiceless consonants and as a voiced  before voiced consonants. A syllable-final  can be heard as a uvular stop  after  or  vowel sounds.

  rarely exists as a phoneme, and is only attested in a few words with a palatal or alveolo-palatal initial.

References

External links
A phonological profile of Chone

Languages of China
Central Bodish languages